The Samoan ambassador in New York City is the official representative of the Government in Apia to the Government of the United States and is Permanent Representative next the Headquarters of the United Nations.

List of representatives 

Samoa–United States relations

References 

United States
Samoa
Permanent Representatives of Samoa to the United Nations